Pleurospermum is a genus of flowering plants belonging to the family Apiaceae.

Its native range is Europe to Korea and Himalaya.

Species:
 Pleurospermum albimarginatum H.Wolff 
 Pleurospermum angelicoides (DC.) Benth. ex C.B.Clarke

References

Apioideae
Apioideae genera